The New Orleans Jazz Vipers are a swing band from New Orleans, Louisiana.

History

The New Orleans Jazz Vipers are a  swing jazz band that plays music by Billie Holiday, Duke Ellington, Louis Armstrong, Dicky Wells, Benny Carter, and Count Basie, as well as originals. The band was founded in 1999 and is led by saxophonist Joe Braun. In 2009, the original Jazz Vipers split into two separate bands.

Members
 Joe Braun – saxophone
 Craig Klein – trombone
 Molly Reeves – guitar
 Earl Bonie – clarinet
 Steve DeTroy – piano
 Mitchell Player – double bass

Awards and honors
 Best of the Beat Award for Best Traditional Jazz Album, Live on Frenchmen Street, Offbeat, 2004
 Best Traditional Jazz Band, Big Easy Awards, 2005

Discography
 The New Orleans Jazz Vipers (2002)
 Live on Frenchmen Street (2004)
 Hope You're Comin' Back (2006)
 Blue Turning Grey (2013)
 Going, Going, Gone (2015)
 Live and Viperizin'  (2017)
 Is There A Chance For Me  (2020)

References

External links

 Official site

Jazz musicians from New Orleans